Ryan Zapolski (born November 11, 1986) is an American ice hockey coach and former professional goaltender.

Early life
Zapolski was born and raised in Erie, Pennsylvania. He attended Cathedral Preparatory School in Erie, Pennsylvania.

Playing career
Zapolski attended the Mercyhurst College from 2007 to 2011 where he played NCAA Division I college hockey for the Mercyhurst Lakers men's ice hockey team. His best college season was 2008–09, with a record of 18–5–3, a save percentage of .934, and a goals-against average of 2.22.

Zapolski began his professional career in the ECHL by joining the Florida Everblades where he appeared in net for one playoff game near the end of the 2010–11 season. The 2012–13 season was his breakout year, and he was recognized for his outstanding play with the South Carolina Stingrays by being named the ECHL's Rookie of the Year, Goaltender of the Year, and the league's Most Valuable Player.

In 2013, Zapolski opted to continue his career overseas, signing with Lukko of the Finnish Liiga. He spent three years with the club, before signing a two-year deal with Helsinki-based Jokerit, a member of the Kontinental Hockey League (KHL) in April 2016.

After three seasons in the KHL with Jokerit, Zapolski left as a free agent and continued his European career in Austria, agreeing to a one-year contract with the Vienna Capitals of the EBEL on July 9, 2019.

Awards and honors

References

External links
 

1986 births
Living people
American expatriate ice hockey players in Finland
American men's ice hockey goaltenders
Florida Everblades players
Gwinnett Gladiators players
Ice hockey players at the 2018 Winter Olympics
Jokerit players
Kalamazoo Wings (ECHL) players
Lukko players
Mercyhurst Lakers men's ice hockey players
Olympic ice hockey players of the United States
South Carolina Stingrays players
Toledo Walleye players
Sportspeople from Erie, Pennsylvania
Ice hockey coaches from Pennsylvania
Ice hockey players from Pennsylvania
American expatriate ice hockey players in Austria